Kay Dee Bell (October 14, 1914 – October 27, 1994) was an American football player who played two seasons in the National Football League with the Chicago Bears and New York Giants. He was drafted by the Detroit Lions in the tenth round of the 1937 NFL Draft. He played college football at Washington State University and attended Abraham Lincoln High School in Seattle, Washington. Bell was also a member of the Los Angeles Bulldogs, Cleveland Rams and Columbus Bulls. He was a professional wrestler and actor as well.

College career
Bell lettered for the Washington State Cougars from 1934 to 1936. He earned All-American honors.

Professional football career
Bell was selected by the Chicago Bears with the 97th pick in the 1937 NFL Draft. He played in ten games, starting one, for the team during the 1937 season. He played in six games, starting five, for the Los Angeles Bulldogs from 1939 to 1940. Bell signed with the Cleveland Rams in 1940 but did not appear in a game for the team. He played in seven games, starting four, for the Columbus Bulls of the American Football League in 1941. He played in eleven games for the New York Giants in 1942.

Professional wrestling career
Bell had a long career as a professional wrestler under the ring names of "Samson", a reference to him appearing in the film Samson and Delilah, and his real name "Kay Bell". He won the Texas Heavyweight Championship in July 1946.

Acting career
Bell was Victor Mature's double in the 1949 film Samson and Delilah. He appeared in a stunt position in the 1956 film The Ten Commandments. He also appeared in the 1949 film Everybody Does It. Bell had parts in several TV shows as well.

Personal life
Bell worked as a deep sea diver during the football off-season. He later retired from professional wrestling to work as a San Mateo County jailer for two years. He then spent fifteen years as a teacher, the last nine in a special-education program for children in San Mateo. Bell died of cancer on October 27, 1994, at his home in Redmond, Washington.

References

External links
Just Sports Stats
wrestlingdata.com profile

1914 births
1994 deaths
Players of American football from Washington (state)
American football tackles
American football guards
Washington State Cougars football players
Chicago Bears players
New York Giants players
American male professional wrestlers
Professional wrestlers from Washington (state)
20th-century American male actors
American stunt performers
American male film actors
American male television actors
Male actors from Washington (state)
American underwater divers
20th-century American educators
Schoolteachers from California
People from Chehalis, Washington
Deaths from cancer in Washington (state)